Parablechnum minus, synonym Blechnum minus, is a small fern growing in moist situations in a variety of habitats in eastern Australia. It is often seen by streams.

It first appeared in scientific literature in the year 1810, as Stegania minor in the Prodromus Florae Novae Hollandiae, published by the prolific Scottish botanist, Robert Brown. It was later moved to the genus Blechnum and then to Parablechnum.

References

Blechnaceae
Ferns of Australia
Flora of New South Wales
Flora of Queensland
Flora of Tasmania
Flora of Victoria (Australia)
Plants described in 1810
Taxa named by Robert Brown (botanist, born 1773)